The Antiprohibitionists on Drugs was a libertarian electoral list active in Italy from 1989 to 1992, successor of the Radical Party.

Electoral results

European Parliament

References

1989 establishments in Italy
1992 disestablishments in Italy
Political parties established in 1989
Political parties disestablished in 1992
Liberal parties in Italy
Radical parties in Italy
Cannabis political parties
Single-issue parties in Italy
Libertarian parties
Libertarianism in Italy
Defunct political parties in Italy